The 10.5 cm Feldhaubitze 98/09 (10.5 cm FH 98/09), a short barreled (1625 mm) 105mm howitzer, also referred to as the 10.5 cm leichte Feldhaubitze (light field howitzer) 98/09, was used by the German Empire, Kingdom of Romania as well as the Ottoman Empire in World War I and after.

History 
It was originally built by Rheinmetall as the 10.5 cm Feldhaubitze 98, an old-fashioned, fixed-recoil weapon delivered to the German army in 1898; between 1902 and 1904, it was redesigned, by Krupp, with a new recoil mechanism and a new carriage. However, it wasn't accepted for service until 1909, hence the ending designation 98/09. Existing weapons were rebuilt to the new standard. As usual, two seats were attached to the gun shield. There were 1,260 in service at the beginning of World War I. Romania captured around 64 pieces from the German Army during World War I, and put them into service during the interwar years.

The 10.5 cm leFH 16 was introduced in 1916 as a successor to 10.5 cm Feldhaubitze 98/09, featuring a longer barrel and hence longer range.

Ammunition 
The 10.5 cm used three different types of ammunition and the aiming instruments were marked with three different meter scales and a dial sight for both direct and indirect fire. Originally, it used 7 charges of propellant, but this was increased during the war to 8 in an effort to extend its range.
 Feldhaubitz granate 98: A 15.8 kilogram (35 lb) high-explosive shell.
 Feldhaubitz schrapnel 98: A 12.8 kilogram (28 lb) shrapnel shell.

See also

Weapons of comparable role, performance and era 
 QF 4.5-inch howitzer British equivalent
 10.5 cm Feldhaubitze M.12 Romanian upgrade of the 10.5 cm Feldhaubitze 98/09

Gallery

References 
 Jäger, Herbert. German Artillery of World War One. Ramsbury, Marlborough, Wiltshire: Crowood Press, 2001

Notes

External links 

 10.5 cm FH 98/09 on Landships
 List and pictures of World War I surviving 10.5 lFH 98/09 howitzers

World War I howitzers
Field artillery of Germany
Artillery of the Ottoman Empire
World War I artillery of Germany
105 mm artillery